Kolbert is a surname. Notable people named Kolbert are:

 Elizabeth Kolbert (born 1961), journalist and author, staff writer for The New Yorker, especially on climate change
 Kathryn Kolbert, lawyer and journalist, activist on women's reproductive rights

See also
 Colbert (disambiguation)